"Take You Dancing" is a song by American singer Jason Derulo. It was released as a single on July 22, 2020, by Atlantic Records, a sister of his previous home label Warner Records. The song was written by Teemu Brunila, Derulo, Emanuel "Eman" Kiriakou, Sarah Solovay and Shawn Charles.

At the APRA Music Awards of 2022, the song was nominated for Most Performed International Work.

Background
Talking about the song, Derulo said, "In these times, we all need a song that's going to uplift us. Hopefully Take You Dancing can be a light in these trying days."

Personnel
Credits adapted from Tidal.

 Emanuel "Eman" Kiriakou – producer, bass, editor, engineer, guitar, keyboards, programmer, writer
 Teemu Brunila – producer, bass, editor, engineer, guitar, keyboards, programmer, recorded by, writer
 Chris Gehringer – masterer
 Serban Ghenea – mixer
 Ben Hogarth – recorded by
 Jason Derulo – vocals, writer
 Sarah Solovay – writer, vocals
 Shawn Charles – writer

Charts

Weekly charts

Year-end charts

Certifications

Release history

See also
List of Airplay 100 number ones of the 2020s

References

2020 songs
2020 singles
Jason Derulo songs
Song recordings produced by Emanuel Kiriakou
Songs about dancing
Songs written by Emanuel Kiriakou
Songs written by Jason Derulo
Songs written by Teemu Brunila
Number-one singles in Romania
Atlantic Records singles